Susan Beth Horwitz (January 6, 1955 – June 11, 2014) was an American computer scientist noted for her research on  
programming languages and  software engineering, and in particular on program slicing and 
dataflow-analysis. She had several best paper and an impact paper award mentioned below under awards.

She was an award-winning teacher at her institution and was the founder of Peer Led Team Learning for Computer Science (PLTLCS), creating the Wisconsin Emerging Scholars-Computer Science (WES-CS) program. She took the lead for an NSF ITWF Grant 0420343 that was a collaboration between eight schools doing PLTLCS, including the University of Wisconsin–Madison with Horwitz, Duke University, Georgia Tech, Rutgers University, University of Wisconsin at Milwaukee, Purdue University, Beloit College, and Loyola College. They published a paper in 2009 that showed that active recruiting combined with peer-led team learning is an effective approach to attracting and retaining under-represented students in an introductory Computer Science class. She was also noted for her leadership in computing in high schools. She was a member of the Educational Testing Services Advanced Placement Computer Science Test Development Committee for ten years from 1987 to 1997, including chairing the committee for five years from 1992 to 1997 at a time when the programming language for the exam changed from Pascal to C++.

Biography
Horwitz received an A.B. magna cum laude in Ethnomusicology from Wesleyan University in 1977,   
a M.S. in Computer Science from Cornell University in 1982 and a Ph.D in Computer Science from Cornell University in 1985. She joined the Department of Computer Science at the University of Wisconsin in Madison as an assistant professor in 1985. She was promoted to associate professor in 1991, and to professor in 1996. She was associate chair from 2004 to 2007. She became an emeritus professor in 2014.

Death
Horwitz died on June 11, 2014, aged 59, from stomach cancer.

Awards
Horwitz received several best paper awards:
 Her 1988 paper "Interprocedural slicing using dependence graphs" (with T. Reps and D. Binkley) was selected as one of the 50 best papers to appear at the ACM SIGPLAN Conference on Programming Language Design and Implementation (PLDI) during the period 1979–99.
 In 2011, she received an ACM SIGSOFT Retrospective Impact Paper Award (with T. Reps, M. Sagiv, and G. Rosay) for their paper "Speeding up slicing", which appeared at the SIGSOFT Symposium on Foundations of Software Engineering (FSE) in 1994.
 Her paper "Reducing the Overhead of Dynamic Analysis" (with S. Yong) in 2002 at the Second Workshop on Runtime Verification was selected as one of the best papers at the workshop and invited for submission to a special issue of the journal Formal Methods in System Design.
 Her paper "Demand interprocedural dataflow analysis" (with Thomas Reps and Mooly Sagiv) in SIGSOFT '95 was selected as one of the best papers at the conference invited for submission to ACM Transactions on Software Engineering and Methodology.
 Her paper "Precise interprocedural dataflow analysis with applications to constant propagation" (with M. Saviv and T. Reps) in TAPSOFT '95 was selected as one of the best papers in the conference and invited for submission to Theoretical Computer Science.

Horwitz has several awards at Wisconsin:
 University of Wisconsin College of Letters and Science Distinguished Honors Faculty Award, 2011
 University of Wisconsin Computer Sciences Department Carolyn Rosner Excellent Educator Award, 1997
 University of Wisconsin William H. Kiekhofer Excellence in Teaching Award, 1993
 University of Wisconsin College of Letters and Sciences Teaching Excellence Award, 1992

References

1955 births
2014 deaths
Deaths from cancer in Wisconsin
Deaths from stomach cancer
American women computer scientists
American computer scientists
Cornell University alumni
Wesleyan University alumni
University of Wisconsin–Madison faculty
20th-century American women scientists
American women academics
21st-century American women